The Jubilee cultivar of tomato is heavy yielding, low acid, with golden fruit that grow on indeterminate vines. It was released by Burpee Seeds in 1943.

See also 

 List of tomato cultivars
NatureSweet

Sources 

Tomato cultivars
Food and drink introduced in 1943